In sport, the Second Division, also called Division 2 or Division II is usually the second highest division of a league, and will often have promotion and relegation with divisions above and below. Following the rise of Premier League style competitions, many leagues known as the Second Division have fallen to a lower tier in countries' football league system.

This list of Second Divisions in association football, divided by authority, includes country and actual level.

AFC
 K League Challenge, South Korea (second tier)
 J. League Division 2, Japan (second tier)
 I League  2, India (second tier)

UEFA
 Albanian Second Division, Albania (third tier)
 Segona Divisió, Andorra (second tier)
 Belarusian Second League, Belarus (third tier)
 Belgian Second Division, Belgium (second tier)
 Second League of the Republika Srpska, Bosnia and Herzegovina (third tier)
 Czech 2. Liga, Czech Republic (second tier)
 Cypriot Second Division, Cyprus (second tier)
 Druga HNL, Croatia (second tier)
 Danish 2nd Division, Denmark (third tier)
 England
 Football League Second Division (1892–1992; second tier, re-branded as Football League First Division after creation of top-level FA Premier League)
 EFL Championship, (second tier)
 Isthmian League Second Division, (ninth tier)
 Second League of Estonia (third tier)
 2. deild, Faroe Islands (third tier)
 Kakkonen, Finland (third tier)
 Ligue 2, France (second tier)
 Second Macedonian Football League (Macedonian Vtora Liga), Republic of Macedonia (second tier)
 Meore Liga, Georgia (third tier)
 2. Fußball-Bundesliga, Germany (second tier)
 Football League (Greece) (formerly Beta Ethniki, Greece (second tier)
 Nemzeti Bajnokság II (Hungarian National Championship II), Hungary (second tier)
 2. deild karla, Iceland (third tier)
 Italy
 Serie B, (second tier)
 Lega Pro Seconda Divisione (fourth tier)
 Maltese Second Division, Malta (third tier)
 Montenegrin Second League, Montenegro (second tier)
 Norwegian Second Division (2. divisjon), Norway (third tier)
 II liga (Poland) (Polish Second League), Poland (third tier)
Portugal
 Liga de Honra, formerly "Segunda Divisão de Honra", (second tier)
 Segunda Divisão (Portuguese Second Division), (third tier)
 Liga II, Romania
 Russian Second Division, Russia (third tier)
 Scottish Football League Second Division, Scotland (third tier)
 2. Liga (Slovakia) (Slovak Second League), Slovakia (second tier)
 Slovenian Second League, Slovenia (second tier)
 Segunda División de La Liga, Spain
 Swedish football Division 2, Sweden (fourth tier)
 TFF Second League, Turkey (third tier)
 Ukrainian Second League, Ukraine (third tier)
 V.League 3, Vietname (third tier)
 Welsh Football League Division Two, Wales (second tier)

CONCACAF

 Aruban Division Uno, Aruba (second tier)
 Barbados Division One, Barbados (second tier)
 Segunda División de Costa Rica, Costa Rica (second tier)
 Segunda División de El Salvador, El Salvador (second tier)
 GFA First Division, Grenada (second tier)
 Primera División de Ascenso, Guatemala (second tier)
 Honduran Liga Nacional de Ascenso, Honduras (second tier)
 Jamaica
 Eastern Confederation Super League (second tier)
 KSAFA Super League (second tier)
 South Central Confederation Super League (second tier)
 Western Confederation Super League (second tier)
 Mexico
 Ascenso MX (second tier)
 Segunda División de México (formerly Segunda División Profesional) (third tier)
 Segunda División de Nicaragua, Nicaragua (second tier)
 Liga Nacional de Ascenso, Panama (second tier)
 SKNFA Division 1, Saint Kitts and Nevis (second tier)
 SLFA Second Division, St. Lucia (second tier)
 SVB Hoofdklasse, Suriname (second tier)
 National Super League, Trinidad and Tobago (second tier)
 United States
 United Soccer League (second tier)
 North American Soccer League (second tier)

CONMEBOL
 Primera B Nacional, Argentina (second tier)
 Campeonato Brasileiro Série B, Brazil (second tier)
 Ecuadorian Serie B, Ecuador (second tier)
 Paraguayan Segunda División, Paraguay (second tier)
 Peruvian Segunda División, Peru (second tier)
 Uruguayan Segunda División, Uruguay (second tier)
 Venezuelan Segunda División, Venezuela (second tier)

See also
 B Division (disambiguation)

Association football leagues